December 9 - Eastern Orthodox liturgical calendar - December 11

All fixed commemorations below celebrated on December 23 by Eastern Orthodox Churches on the Old Calendar.

For December 10th, Orthodox Churches on the Old Calendar commemorate the Saints listed on November 27.

Saints
 Martyrs Menas the Most Eloquent, Hermogenes, and Eugraphus, of Alexandria (c. 313)
 Martyr Gemellus of Paphlagonia (Gemellus of Ancyra), cruelly tortured and crucified (361))
 Martyr Theotecnus, by the sword.
 Martyr Marianus, by stoning.
 Martyr Eugenios, beaten to death.
 Venerable Thomas Dephourkinos of Mt. Kyminas in Bithynia (Thomas the Righteous) (10th century)

Pre-Schism Western saints
 Saints Carpophorus and Abundius, a priest and his deacon who suffered under Diocletian (c. 290-300)
 Virgin-martyr Eulalia of Barcelona, the most famous virgin-martyr in Spain, burnt at the stake under Diocletian (304)
 Saint Julia of Mérida (Eulalia of Mérida), a martyr together with St Eulalia, in Mérida in Spain under Diocletian (304)
 Saint Mercurius and Companions, at Lentini in Sicily, soldiers who were beheaded under the governor Tertyllus, in the time of Emperor Licinius (c. 308)
 Saint Deusdedit of Brescia, Bishop of Brescia in Italy, played a leading part in the Councils against Monothelitism (c. 700)
 Pope Saint Miltiades, Pope of Rome from 311 to 314, who condemned Donatism and was venerated as a martyr on account of his many sufferings during the persecution of Maximian (314)
 Pope Saint Gregory III, who was much troubled by Iconoclasm and the raids of the Lombards (741) 
 Saint Sindulf of Vienne (Sindulphus), the thirty-first Bishop of Vienne in France (c. 669)
 Saint Guitmarus, fourth Abbot of Saint-Riquier in France (765)
 Saint Hildemar (Hildemanus), a monk at Corbie who became Bishop of Beauvais in France in 821 (844)

Post-Schism Orthodox saints
 Blessed Jovan Branković, King of Serbia (1503), and his parents Stephen the Blind (1468) and Saint Angelina (Brancovic) (16th century)
 Saint Ioasaph (Gorlenko) of Belgorod (1754)  (see also September 4 )

New martyrs and confessors
 New Hieromartyr Alexander (Shklaev) of Perm, Protopresbyter (1918)
 New Hieromartyr Jacob (Shestakov) of Perm, Priest (1918)
 Hieromartyr Eugraphus (Pletnev) of Perm, Priest, and his son, Mikhail Pletnev (1918)
 New Hieromartyrs of Ryazan: Protopresbyters - Anatolius Pravdoliubov, Alexander Tuberovsky, Eugene Kharkov, and Constantine Bazhanov (1937), and with them:
 New Hieromartyr Nicholas Karasiov, Priest.
 Martyrs Peter Grishin, Michael Yakunkin, Eusebius Tryakhov, Dorotheus Klimashev, Laurentius Kogtyev, Gregory Berdenev.
 Virgin-martyrs Alexandra Ustiukhina and Tatiana Yegorova.
 New Hieromartyr Michael Kobozev, Priest.
 New Hieromartyr Sergius Sorokin, Hieromonk of Sreznevo (Ryazan) (1937)
 Virgin-martyr Eudocia (after 1937)
 New Hieromartyr Protopresbyter Nicholas Rozov of Yaroslavl-Rostov (1938)
 New Hieromartyr Alexis Vvedensky, Priest (1938)
 Virgin-martyrs Anna Ivashkina and Tatiana Byakirevoy, Confessors (1948)
 Virgin-martyr Thecla Makusheva, Confessor (1954)
 Venerable New Nun-Confessor Anna Stoliarova, Schema-nun of Sreznevo, Ryazan (1958)

Other commemorations
 Synaxis of the Archangel Michael at the Adda River in northern Italy, before the Battle of Coronate (689)

Icon gallery

Notes

References

Sources 
 December 10/23. Orthodox Calendar (PRAVOSLAVIE.RU).
 December 23 / December 10. HOLY TRINITY RUSSIAN ORTHODOX CHURCH (A parish of the Patriarchate of Moscow).
 December 10. OCA - The Lives of the Saints.
 The Autonomous Orthodox Metropolia of Western Europe and the Americas (ROCOR). St. Hilarion Calendar of Saints for the year of our Lord 2004. St. Hilarion Press (Austin, TX). p. 92.
 December 10. Latin Saints of the Orthodox Patriarchate of Rome.
 The Roman Martyrology. Transl. by the Archbishop of Baltimore. Last Edition, According to the Copy Printed at Rome in 1914. Revised Edition, with the Imprimatur of His Eminence Cardinal Gibbons. Baltimore: John Murphy Company, 1916. pp. 379–380.
Greek Sources
 Great Synaxaristes:  10 ΔΕΚΕΜΒΡΙΟΥ. ΜΕΓΑΣ ΣΥΝΑΞΑΡΙΣΤΗΣ.
  Συναξαριστής. 10 Δεκεμβρίου. ECCLESIA.GR. (H ΕΚΚΛΗΣΙΑ ΤΗΣ ΕΛΛΑΔΟΣ). 
Russian Sources
  23 декабря (10 декабря). Православная Энциклопедия под редакцией Патриарха Московского и всея Руси Кирилла (электронная версия). (Orthodox Encyclopedia - Pravenc.ru).
  10 декабря (ст.ст.) 23 декабря 2013 (нов. ст.). Русская Православная Церковь Отдел внешних церковных связей. (DECR).

December in the Eastern Orthodox calendar